Assad Abdul Ghanee (born 2 January 1976) is a Maldivian international footballer.

Career
Ghanee made his international debut in 2001, and he has appeared in FIFA World Cup qualifying matches.

He officially retired from the national team, on 14 February 2013 with the team mate Ahmed Thariq, after the friendly match played between Pakistan at Rasmee Dhandu Stadium. He was awarded with a "golden plaque" by Football Association of Maldives as recognition of his contribution to the national team.

Honours

Maldives
 SAFF Championship: 2008

References

External links
 
 

1976 births
Living people
Maldivian footballers
Maldives international footballers
Club Valencia players
New Radiant S.C. players
Footballers at the 2002 Asian Games
Footballers at the 2006 Asian Games

Association football defenders
Asian Games competitors for the Maldives
Club Eagles players